Club de Fútbol Monterrey Premier was a professional football team that played in the Mexican Football League. They played in the Liga Premier (Mexico's Second Division). Club de Fútbol Monterrey Premier was affiliated with C.F. Monterrey who plays in the Liga MX. The games were held in the city of Santiago in El Barrial.

Players

Current squad

References

Football clubs in Nuevo León
Liga Premier de México